The Little Book is a New York Times best-selling novel by American writer Selden Edwards. Edwards began writing the novel in 1974, worked on it for over 30 years, and the manuscript was accepted by Dutton in 2007.

A life's work
In 1974, when he was a young teacher in California, author Selden Edwards started to write a novel. Over the next thirty years he toiled over the same manuscript – revising it, adding layers and complexity to the tale. Winters and summers, when his colleagues were on vacation and his family was outside enjoying Santa Barbara, Lake Tahoe or rural Michigan, Edwards would remain in his study and write. Each time he completed a new draft, he would send it to publishers and agents, but to no avail.

Upon his retirement from teaching in 2003, Edwards gave it one last try. Working with a freelance editor, he spent another year on the manuscript. This time there was no rejection slip. A literary agent called him “almost immediately” and submitted his novel to Dutton, whose editors purchased it within four days.

Plot
The Little Book follows the character of Wheeler Burden, a wealthy 80's rock idol that suddenly finds himself in 1897 Vienna. Wheeler quickly uses his knowledge of the late 19th century and a set of stolen clothes to fit in with the environment. Soon Wheeler has met not only Sigmund Freud but also his own father. However the mystery of Wheeler's time travel still remains, and his impact on fin-de-siècle Vienna may have deeper implications than he realized.

Critical reception

Reception for The Little Book was overwhelmingly positive, with Publishers Weekly calling it “a sweet, wistful elegy to the fantastic promise and failed hopes of the 20th century.” USA Today, Entertainment Weekly, and the Courier-Journal also praised the book, with the Courier-Journal stating the book was "full of surprises".

NPR's Maureen Corrigan hailed it as “a historical time travel fantasy that's an ideal late summer reading getaway, complete with screwball hidden identity plots and even lively background music…Edwards handles the hectic demands of a multistranded plot with deftness and humor.”

The novel was also noted for its “balanced, powerful style,” and “a maturity that is exceedingly rare.” In general, The Little Book was found “a masterpiece of unequaled storytelling that announces Selden Edwards as one of the most dazzling, original, entertaining novelists of our time.”

References

External links
 Penguin Group Official Publisher Page
 Official website
 Video of author discussing the book

2008 American novels
Novels about time travel
Novels set in Vienna
Dutton Penguin books